The National Maritime Museum of Ireland opened in 1978 in the former  Mariners' Church in Moran Park, located between the seafront and the centre of Dún Laoghaire town, southeast of Dublin city.  President Michael D. Higgins officially re-opened the museum in 2012.

History
The church was built in 1837 for seafarers and remained open until 1971. In 1974 the Church of Ireland and the Maritime Institute of Ireland signed an agreement that led to the museum's opening.

In 2006 substantial funding was authorised by the Government for capital expenditure to cover the cost of the refurbishment, however this funding has since ceased, and the museum is now dependent upon door receipts, fund raising events and donations.  It is operated by volunteers and a community employment scheme provided by the Department of Social Protection. In July 2011 two stained-glass windows by artist Peadar Lamb were installed in the former church, sponsored by the Dún Laoghaire Harbour Company. It reopened on 5 June 2012.

Exhibits

 The Irish Lights: this exhibit is dominated by the Baily Optic from the Baily Lighthouse on Howth Head, which was in use from 1902 to 1972.  It includes some inventions of John Richardson Wigham.

 Artefacts recovered from the wreck of the RMS Leinster and some contemporary accounts of the event. It was torpedoed in 1918 off the Kish lighthouse, within sight of Dún Laoghaire. Over 500 people were drowned.
 St Columba's Chapel: this area remembers Irish ships during World War II. The Mariners Church building is also a major attraction.

References

External links

Maritime Institute of Ireland
Dún-laoghaire.com article on museum

Buildings and structures in Dún Laoghaire–Rathdown
History museums in the Republic of Ireland
Museums in Dún Laoghaire–Rathdown
Maritime history of Ireland
Museums established in 1978
National museums of the Republic of Ireland
Maritime museums in the Republic of Ireland